La Crucecita, along with Tangolunda and Santa Cruz comprise the resort area known as Huatulco, in the Mexican state of Oaxaca.
It is the community closest to the bays but it is only  from Federal Highway 200. It has grown along with the development of tourism in the area. The community is within the Santa María Huatulco municipality, which is part of the Pochutla District in the Costa Region of Oaxaca.

The town church, called Parroquia Nuestra Señora de Guadalupe y de la Santa Cruz, is located in front of the park in the center of town.

References

Populated places in Oaxaca
Populated coastal places in Mexico
Pacific Coast of Mexico